Nekoite is a triclinic, white silicate mineral consisting of calcium, silicon, oxygen and water. Its discovery was first published in 1956.

Etymology 
Its name derives from okenite, which it was originally mistaken for.

Properties 
This translucent crystal is described as having a pearl white color. It is also said to have a vitreous (glass-like) lustre.

Media appearances 
It is featured in Stardew Valley as a minor item obtained from geodes.

References 

Calcium minerals
Minerals described in 1956
Triclinic minerals